William Henry O'Sullivan (1829 – 27 April 1887) was an Irish Home Rule League politician.

He was elected as a Home Rule Member of Parliament (MP) for County Limerick in 1874 and held the seat until it was abolished in 1885.

References

External links
 

1829 births
1887 deaths
Home Rule League MPs
Members of the Parliament of the United Kingdom for County Leitrim constituencies (1801–1922)
UK MPs 1874–1880
UK MPs 1880–1885